Tetracha coerulea is a species of tiger beetle that was described by Hippolyte Lucas in 1857, and is endemic to Bolivia.

References

Cicindelidae
Beetles described in 1857
Endemic fauna of Bolivia
Beetles of South America